Slo Sco: The Best of the Ballads is a compilation album by jazz guitarist John Scofield. The tracks on this album have been taken from previously released albums on  Gramavision Records from 1984 until 1989.

Track listing
"Still Warm"
"Heaven Hill"
"Phone Home"
"True Love"
"Time Marches On"
"Now She's Blonde"
"Spy Versus Spy"
"Gil B643"
"Thanks Again"
"Signature of Venus"
"Best Western"
"Evansville"

Personnel
 John Scofield – guitar
 David Sanborn – alto saxophone
 Mitchel Forman – keyboards
 Robert Aries – keyboards
 Don Grolnick – keyboards
 Pete Levin – synthesizer
 Hiram Bullock – guitar
 Anthony Cox – double bass
 Gary Grainger – bass guitar
 Darryl Jones – bass guitar
 Terri Lyne Carrington – drums
 Dennis Chambers – drums
 Steve Jordan – drums
 Omar Hakim – drums
 Don Alias – percussion

References

1990 compilation albums
John Scofield compilation albums
Gramavision Records compilation albums